José Paolo Guerrero Gonzales (born 1 January 1984), known as Paolo Guerrero, is a Peruvian professional footballer who plays as a striker for Primera División side  Racing Club.

Forging his career in Germany, Guerrero started at giants Bayern Munich, before making his name at Hamburger SV, scoring 47 goals across eight Bundesliga seasons. His greatest successes came in Brazil, where he scored the winning goal of the 2012 FIFA Club World Cup Final for Corinthians.

With 38 goals in 107 matches for Peru since debuting at 20, Guerrero holds the honour of being the highest goalscorer for his national team. He has represented them at five Copas América and one World Cup. He led them to third place in the 2011 and 2015 Copas, and to runners-up in 2019, finishing as top scorer in all three of these tournaments. He is also the top scoring active player in the Copa América. He was one of 59 nominees for the 2015 FIFA Ballon d'Or, becoming the first Peruvian to receive that recognition. He's also the oldest Peruvian player to appear in a World Cup, at the age of 34 and 177 days.

In 2021, the IFFHS included Guerrero in their best South American team of the last decade, being recognized as the best South American center forward between 2010 and 2020 (joining the podium with Neymar and Sergio Agüero).
In addition, he was voted the "best centre forward in America" in 2012 and 2017 by the newspaper El País, based on the opinion of some two hundred journalists from the region. He has also been named included by CONMEBOL in the teams of the tournament for the 2011, 2015 and 2019 Copas América.

Club career

Early career
Guerrero was born in Lima, starting his football career in the youth teams of Alianza Lima. In 2003, he signed a contract with Bavarian giants Bayern Munich. During the 2003–04 season, Guerrero played in the Regionalliga Süd where he scored 21 goals in 23 games. During the 2004–05 season, he joined fellow countryman Claudio Pizarro as a member of the Bayern first team.

Hamburger SV

In June 2006, it was announced that Guerrero had transferred to Hamburger SV and signed a contract with the club through 2010. His first season was marred by an injury, which took away half his season, and his low productivity, being a sub most of the season. Near the end, he did score three goals, making his season total 5 goals in 20 games. One of these goals was against former club Bayern Munich in a 1–2 victory which left Bayern with no possibilities of making it to the UEFA Champions League. In the 2007–08 season, his second at Hamburg, Guerrero played 29 of 34 games in the Bundesliga, scoring nine goals and getting four assists, as well as becoming an undisputed starter and a vital part of the side; he was the third top scorer, behind Rafael van der Vaart (12 goals) and Ivica Olić (14 goals). In the UEFA Cup and qualification, he played nine games, scoring five goals and getting three assists. His first hat-trick in his professional career was against Karlsruher SC, in the last game of the Bundesliga, scoring the second, third, and fourth goals in a 7–0 victory. This victory secured them fourth place and a UEFA Cup spot for next season.

By the beginning of the 2008–09 season, Guerrero had become first choice striker for Hamburger SV. Coach Martin Jol even went as far as saying that Guerrero better not catch even a cold during the season. Guerrero was fined a club record (somewhere in the region of €50,000–100,000), in April 2010 for an incident at the end of a league game with Hannover 96, where after apparently having been abused by a Hamburg fan, Guerrero threw his drink bottle into the crowd, striking that fan in the face. The German Football Association (DFB) suspended Guerrero for five league games and fined him €20,000.

Corinthians

Guerrero joined Brazilian club Corinthians on 13 July 2012, on a three-year deal for a fee of R$7.5 million. He scored both of their goals in the 2012 FIFA Club World Cup, once in the semi-finals against Al Ahly SC and the winning goal in the final against Chelsea.

In May 2013, Guerrero became the first Peruvian footballer to appear on the cover of Placar, Brazil's biggest football magazine. The cover featured him as a warrior ("guerrero" is similar to the Portuguese word "guerreiro", both meaning "warrior") fresh out of battle, with blood on his legs, and carrying a Corinthians flag.

In July 2013, Corinthians won the 2013 Recopa Sudamericana, defeating city rivals São Paulo FC 3–1 on aggregate. Guerrero scored in the first leg, a 2–1 away win.

In 2015, Guerrero and Corinthians were not able to reach a deal on the renegotiation of his contract, due to end on 15 July. His last game for Corinthians was against Fluminense on 24 May. Corinthians confirmed his release three days later.

Flamengo

It was announced on 29 May 2015, that Guerrero would join Flamengo after playing for Peru in the Copa América in Chile.

In the 2017 Campeonato Carioca, Guerrero scored both of Flamengo's goals in a 2–1 semi-final win over Botafogo, and a further goal in the second leg of the final to win 3–1 on aggregate over Fluminense in the Maracanã.

Internacional
On 12 August 2018, Guerrero signed with S.C. Internacional on a three-year contract, after leaving Flamengo on a free transfer. He was given the number 79, to commemorate the last time Inter won the Campeonato Brasileiro. However, days before he was to debut, on 24 August, his FIFA ban was upheld, preventing him from playing his first match until April 2019.

In 2019, Guerrero's number changed from 79 to 9, due to the departure of Leandro Damião. After his ban expired, Guerrero finally made his debut for Inter in the Campeonato Gaúcho against Caxias, on 6 April, scoring in the 2–0 semi-final win. His Copa Libertadores debut came against Palestino of Chile, a match where he scored twice.

On 26 October 2021, Guerrero left Internacional on a "mutual agreement".

Avaí 
On 21 July 2022, Guerrero joined Brazilian Série A side Avaí for the remainder of the 2022 season.

Racing Club 
On 24 January 2023, Guerrero signed for  Argentine Primera División side  Racing Club. He scored his first goal in the 89th minute of the  Racing Club and  San Martin game.

International career
Guerrero's national career began at the 2001 Bolivarian Games where he won gold with the U-17 squad. His career with the senior team began in the unsuccessful 2006 FIFA World Cup qualification campaign, but he managed to score twice for the national side. His first goal was the winner against Chile in Lima's Estadio Nacional. It was followed by a first-minute goal in the next match against Ecuador at the same venue, though the Ecuadorians fought back to secure a 2–2 away draw. In the opening game of the 2007 Copa América in Mérida, Venezuela, Guerrero concluded a 3–0 win over Uruguay as Peru went on to reach the quarter-finals.

Guerrero was ruled out of Peru's first two 2010 World Cup qualifying games because of injury. A further blow to Peru was laid down by FIFA when Guerrero was suspended six games for insulting the referee during the match against Uruguay in June 2008. Following Peru's disastrous qualifying campaign for the 2010 World Cup, José del Solar was replaced with Uruguayan manager Sergio Markarián and Guerrero was called up for the 2011 Copa América. In place of an injured Pizarro, Guerrero played as the team's starting striker in the competition and scored five times, making him the tournament's top scorer, one each against Uruguay and Mexico followed by a hat-trick against Venezuela in the third place play-off match which Peru won 4–1.

At the 2015 Copa América held in Chile, Guerrero scored a hat-trick in a 3–1 win against Bolivia in the quarter-final in Temuco. He scored the second goal in Peru's 2–0 win over Paraguay in the third place play-off, thus helping Peru to third place at the Copa América for a second consecutive time and finishing as joint top-goalscorer with Chile's Eduardo Vargas.

Guerrero became the all-time leading goalscorer for Peru on 4 June 2016, after scoring against Haiti in a 1–0 win at the Copa América Centenario.

Lead-up to the 2018 FIFA World Cup

Guerrero made 17 appearances and scored five goals in the 2018 FIFA World Cup qualifying campaign, helping Peru clinch a berth in the play-offs. On 3 November 2017, it was announced that Guerrero had failed the doping control test after the match against Argentina in the previous month for what was initially reported as a social drug. He received a preemptive 30-day suspension from FIFA, making him miss the World Cup play-off tie against New Zealand, eventually won by Peru.

On 8 December 2017, it was revealed that Guerrero had tested positive for benzoylecgonine, the primary metabolite of cocaine. As a result, he was banned by FIFA from all competitions for one year, meaning that he would not have been able to participate in the 2018 FIFA World Cup. The ban was reduced on appeal 12 days later. Guerrero's lawyers had argued that the failed test had occurred as a result of the consumption of a traditional coca tea, using forensic analysis of the Children of Llullaillaco as evidence.

However, on 14 May 2018, the Court of Arbitration for Sport upheld the appeal filed by the World Anti-Doping Agency, extending the ban to 14 months and ruling him out of the tournament. It accepted that Guerrero did not intend to enhance performance but said he was at fault, even if not significantly.

On 31 May 2018, it was announced Guerrero would be allowed to play at the 2018 FIFA World Cup after the Swiss Federal Tribunal temporarily lifted the ban.

On 3 June 2018, Guerrero made his comeback after a seven-month absence from the national team scoring twice in the 3–0 friendly win against Saudi Arabia.

A 2018 report of investigative journalists of German broadcasting station ARD revealed doping practices in Brazil, involving physician Mohamad Barakat who reportedly treated Guerrero and who had already posed with him many years ago.

2018 FIFA World Cup

Guerrero made his World Cup debut on 16 June 2018, coming off the bench in the 1–0 loss to Denmark. On 26 June, he assisted André Carrillo's goal, which was Peru's first World Cup goal in 36 years, and scored the second goal in Peru's 2–0 win over Australia, in the team's final group match, as his side suffered a first-round exit from the competition. At the age of 34 and 177 days, he became the oldest Peruvian player to appear in a FIFA World Cup.

2019 Copa América
In May 2019, Guerrero was included in Ricardo Gareca's final 23-man squad for the 2019 Copa América in Brazil. He scored the opening goal in Peru's second group game of the tournament on 18 June – a 3–1 victory over Bolivia. In the semi-finals against defending champions Chile on 3 July, Guerrero scored the final goal of a 3–0 win, which saw Peru advance to the final of the tournament for the first time since 1975.

In the 2019 Copa América Final against hosts Brazil on 7 July, at the Maracanã Stadium, Guerrero scored the temporary equaliser from the penalty spot in the first half; the match eventually ended in a 3–1 victory to Brazil. Guerrero finished the tournament as the top scorer with 3 goals, alongside Brazil's Everton Soares, who won the Golden Boot Award due to having played fewer minutes than the Peruvian throughout the tournament.

On 11 October 2019, Guerrero made his 100th international appearance for Peru against Uruguay.

Personal life

Guerrero has a fear of flying. Media reports claim his fear of flying is due to the death of his uncle José González Ganoza in the 1987 Alianza Lima air disaster.

Guerrero's older brother, Julio Rivera, was also a footballer for the Peru national team who progressed through the Alianza Lima youth system. The brothers were both following in the path of their uncle who had represented Alianza Lima and the Peru national team before them.

Guerrero is Roman Catholic.

His nephew, also named Julio Rivera, was found dead from a robbery in Lima. Guerrero held his death with sorrow and honor to his late nephew.

Career statistics

Club

International

Honours

Bayern Munich
Bundesliga: 2004–05, 2005–06
DFB-Pokal: 2004–05, 2005–06

Hamburger SV
UEFA Intertoto Cup: 2007

Corinthians
Campeonato Paulista: 2013
Recopa Sudamericana: 2013
FIFA Club World Cup: 2012

Flamengo
Campeonato Carioca: 2017
Internacional

 Copa do Brasil runner-up: 2019

Peru U17
Bolivarian Games: 2001

Peru
Copa América runner-up: 2019; third-place: 2011, 2015
Individual
 Copa América Top Scorer: 2011, 2015, 2019
 Copa América Team of the Tournament: 2011, 2015, 2019
 FIFA Club World Cup Bronze Ball: 2012
 FIFA Club World Cup Best Forward: 2012 
 Campeonato Paulista Best Forward: 2013
 Campeonato Paulista Team of the Tournament: 2013
 Copa do Brasil Best Player: 2019
 Copa do Brasil Top Scorer: 2019
 2014 Campeonato Paulista: Top Foreign Scorer in Corinthians history
 Campeonato Brasileiro Série A Team of the Year: 2014
 Campeonato Carioca Team of the Year: 2017
 IFFHS CONMEBOL team of the decade 2011–2020

See also
 List of footballers with 100 or more caps

References

External links

 
 
 
 
 Paolo Guerrero profile at Flamengo

1984 births
Living people
Footballers from Lima
Peruvian Roman Catholics
Peruvian footballers
Association football forwards
Club Alianza Lima footballers
FC Bayern Munich II players
FC Bayern Munich footballers
Hamburger SV players
Sport Club Corinthians Paulista players
CR Flamengo footballers
Sport Club Internacional players
Avaí FC players
Regionalliga players
Bundesliga players
Campeonato Brasileiro Série A players
Peru youth international footballers
Peru international footballers
2007 Copa América players
2011 Copa América players
2015 Copa América players
Copa América Centenario players
2018 FIFA World Cup players
2019 Copa América players
FIFA Century Club
Peruvian expatriate footballers
Peruvian expatriate sportspeople in Germany
Peruvian expatriate sportspeople in Brazil
Expatriate footballers in Germany
Expatriate footballers in Brazil
Peruvian sportspeople in doping cases
Doping cases in association football